The men's team competition at the 2010 Asian Games in Guangzhou, China was held from 23 November to 26 November at the Guangzhou Chess Institute. The time was one hour for each side and 30 seconds byoyomi for three times.

Schedule
All times are China Standard Time (UTC+08:00)

Results
Legend
GP — Game points

Preliminary round

Round 1

Round 2

Round 3

Round 4

Round 5

Round 6

Round 7

Summary

Final round

Bronze medal match

Gold medal match

References 

 Official site, with details & photos of Chess, Weiqi (Go) and Xiangqi 

Go at the 2010 Asian Games